Thomas Sinclair (April 9, 1841 – March 8, 1888) was a farmer and political figure in Manitoba. He served in the Legislative Assembly of Assiniboia.

He was born in the Red River Settlement, the son of Thomas Sinclair and Hannah Cummings. Sinclair married Alice Matilda Davis.

He died in Selkirk at the age of 46.

References 

1841 births
1888 deaths
Members of the Legislative Assembly of Assiniboia